Tinashe Fazakerley (born 4 April 1984), now professionally known as Rationale, is a Zimbabwe-born British singer and songwriter, formerly known as Tinashé. He is known for his soulful R&B and indie pop style with electric influences. His alias Tinashé was known for his synthpop sound and his African influences.

Early life
Fazakerley was born in the Harare township of Highfield. At the age of 9, he and his three siblings moved to the United Kingdom in the Camberwell district of London, where his single mother was working as a nurse. Later, at the age of 11, he moved to the London borough of Hackney and music began to play a more significant role in his life as he learned to play the guitar. His influences were varying, ranging from Jimi Hendrix, Prince, Pat Metheny, Donnie Hathaway and Al Green, to Tupac Shakur, A Tribe Called Quest and the Notorious B.I.G.

Career

Tinashé and singing hiatus (2009–2014)
In 2010, after releasing two EPs and three singles, Fazakerley released the album Saved under the stage name Tinashé, but it had limited success.

He took a break from singing and went on to become a songwriter and producer, working with producer Mark Crew, while writing songs for blues artist Rag'n'Bone Man, among others. He also wrote songs for the Swiss version of The Voice talent show.

Rationale (2015–present)
In 2015, he relaunched his career as Rationale, releasing songs such as "Fast Lane" and "Something for Nothing" on SoundCloud and Spotify. It was on these streaming platforms that he gained notable recognition, with a mention by Pharrell Williams on his Apple Music Beats1 radio show, OTHERtone, calling him someone who had "found the beauty in their voice". This elevated Fast Lane to No. 2 within its first week on the Spotify Global Viral Chart, reached No. 1 on Hype Machine, and amassed more than 1.3 million views on SoundCloud. Rationale also received praise from Justin Timberlake and Elton John. He became one of the first artists to be signed to Dan Smith of Bastille's new record label, Best Laid Plans.

His debut self-titled album was released on 6 October 2017, under exclusive license to Warner Music UK. Fazakerley is credited as a songwriter and producer on Katy Perry's 2017 album, Witness on the song, "Act My Age". His single "Tethered" is often covered by Ellie Goulding at her concerts.

In 2019, he was featured on Big Wild′s album "Superdream" on the song "6's to 9's".

In 2021, he was featured on Model Man's self-titled album on the song "Esc (Holding Back)".

Discography

Albums

As Tinashé
 Saved (September 2010)

As Rationale
 Rationale (October 2017)

EPs

As Tinashé
 Mayday
 Zambezi
 Saved

As Rationale
 Fuel to the Fire (September 2015)
 Vessels (February 2017)
 High Hopes (December 2018)

Singles

As Tinashé
 "Mayday" (March 2010)
 "Zambezi" (June 2010)
 "Saved" (September 2010)

As Rationale
 "Fast Lane" (April 2015)
 "Re.Up" (May 2015)
 "Fuel to the Fire" (July 2015)
 "Something for Nothing" (January 2016)
 "Palms" (June 2016)
 "Prodigal Son" (November 2016)
 "Vessels" (December 2016)
 "Reciprocate" (January 2017)
 "Tethered" (February 2017)
 "Deliverance" (March 2017)
 "Loving Life" (July 2017)
 "Into the Blue" (September 2017)
 "Losing Sleep" (October 2017)
 "Somewhere to Belong" (October 2017)
 "Oil & Water" (October 2017)
 "Phenomenal" (October 2017)
 "Tumbling Down" (January 2018)
 "One by One" (September 2018)
 "Kindred" (December 2018)
 "High Hopes" (December 2018)
 "73" (December 2018)
 "Say What's On Your Mind" (July 2019)
 "Hurts the Most" (September 2019)
 "Whiskey Regrets" (March 2020)
 "Wash Over Me" (February 2022)
 "Freedom" (March 2022)

Songwriting and production credits

References

1984 births
Living people
21st-century Black British male singers
British male singer-songwriters
Zimbabwean emigrants to the United Kingdom
People from Harare